Glen Sowry (born 24 April 1962) is a New Zealand sailor. He competed in the Tornado event at the 2000 Summer Olympics.

References

External links
 

1962 births
Living people
New Zealand male sailors (sport)
Olympic sailors of New Zealand
Sailors at the 2000 Summer Olympics – Tornado
Sportspeople from Lower Hutt